Raul Dominguez Quizon (October 5, 1958 – March 15, 2018), better known as Rolly Quizon, was a Filipino actor, and one of Dolphy's children. He gained recognition for portraying namesake character Rolly Puruntong in the Filipino television sitcom John en Marsha.

Life and career
Raul Dominguez Quizon was born on October 5, 1958, to Rodolfo Vera Quizon and former actress Engracita Dominguez, him being the youngest among their six children. He has 12 half-siblings. 

Quizon's performance as a guest in an episode of Dolphy's Special was noticed by Dolphy, and together with Director Ading Fernando, included him in the cast of John en Marsha. During his career, he starred in a number of movies, largely with RVQ Productions alongside Dolphy. On March 9, 2018, Quizon had a stroke, and died on March 15.

Filmography

Television

Movies

Musical Variety Show, Stage

Awards

References

External links

1958 births
2018 deaths
Filipino male child actors
Filipino male television actors
Male actors from Manila
Filipino male film actors
Rolly
20th-century Filipino male actors